Gabriele Askamp (born 12 July 1955) is a German former swimmer. She competed in two events at the 1976 Summer Olympics.

References

1955 births
Living people
German female swimmers
Olympic swimmers of West Germany
Swimmers at the 1976 Summer Olympics
Sportspeople from Bremerhaven
20th-century German women